Kivas Tully, ISO (1820 – 24 April 1905) was an Irish-Canadian architect.

Life
Born in Garryvacum in County Laois, Ireland, Kivas Tully was the son of John P. Tully, a lieutenant in the Royal Navy, and Alicia Willington. He trained as an architect at the Royal Naval School in London, England, before coming to the Province of Canada in 1844, arriving in Toronto, where he began working at the firm of John George Howard, designing many important buildings throughout southern Ontario.

Following Canadian Confederation, Tully joined the Ontario Department of Public Works in 1868. He was appointed the first Ontario Provincial architect (1868–1896) and engineer. He was involved in the supervising of the competition leading to the design of the Ontario Legislative Building at Queen's Park. As the provincial department of public works' chief architect, Tully supervised a series of district courthouses built in northern Ontario. The courthouse at Parry Sound designed in 1871 still forms the core of the present courthouse complex.

The Ontario Archives hold drawings for virtually all provincial buildings including courthouses, registry offices, goals & lock-ups, schools and colleges, hospitals and other works executed under his supervision from 1896 until 1926.

In 1903, Tully was awarded the Imperial Service Order. He had retired in 1896 and died in Toronto on 24 April 1905.

Works
Some of his more prominent projects include:

Personal

Tully was married twice, first to Elizabeth Drew in 1844 (died 1847) and Maria Elizabeth Strickland in 1852 (died 1883). He had four daughters, and was survived by two, including the artist Sydney Strickland Tully (1860–1911), when he died in 1905.

Publications
 Preliminary report of the engineer, on the survey of the various routes, for the proposed ship canal, to connect the waters of lakes Huron & Ontario at Toronto, presented to the president of the Board of Trade, 1857.

See also

Other Ontario provincial architects include:

 Francis R. Heakes
 George A. White
 George N. Williams

References

External links

 
 Historic Places in Canada
 Kivas Tully Dictionary of Architects in Canada 

1820 births
1905 deaths
19th-century Irish people
Irish expatriates in Canada
People educated at the Royal Naval School
Irish architects
Canadian architects
Canadian Companions of the Imperial Service Order
Irish emigrants to pre-Confederation Ontario
People from County Laois
People from Old Toronto
Neoclassical architecture in Canada
Immigrants to the Province of Canada